The ICW / IWCCW Light Heavyweight Championship was the championship for Light heavyweights at a maximum weight of 220 lbs. in International World Class Championship Wrestling. The title existed from 1987 until the federation closed its doors in 1995. The title was first promoted as the “International Championship Wrestling Light Heavyweight” Title but was later renamed the “International World Class Championship Wrestling Light Heavyweight title” when the federation was renamed as well. Because the championship is a professional wrestling championship, it is not won or lost competitively but instead by the decision of the bookers of a wrestling promotion. The championship is awarded after the chosen team "wins" a match to maintain the illusion that professional wrestling is a competitive sport.

Title history

Footnotes

References
General sources

Specific sources

External links
Wrestling-Titles.com

International World Class Championship Wrestling championships
Light heavyweight wrestling championships